Shades of Redd is an album by American pianist Freddie Redd recorded in 1960 and released on the Blue Note label.

Reception

The Allmusic review by Michael G. Nastos stated: "In an all too small discography, Freddie Redd's Shades of Redd is without a doubt his crowning achievement... his zenith as a jazz musician, would be a wonderful addition to any collection, and shows that the lesser known musicians have plenty of music to play, in addition to a unique perspective aside from the giants of this music".

Track listing
All compositions by Freddie Redd

 "The Thespian" - 7:00
 "Blues, Blues, Blues" - 6:00
 "Shadows" - 7:24
 "Melanie" - 5:06
 "Swift" - 4:02
 "Just a Ballad for My Baby" - 4:14
 "Olé" - 6:26
 "Melanie" [alternate take] - 5:28 Bonus track on CD reissue
 "Olé" [alternate take] - 7:37 Bonus track on CD reissue

Personnel
Freddie Redd - piano
Jackie McLean - alto saxophone
Tina Brooks - tenor saxophone
Paul Chambers - bass
Louis Hayes - drums

References

1961 albums
Blue Note Records albums
Freddie Redd albums
Albums recorded at Van Gelder Studio